is a Sanriku Railway Company station located in Yamada, Iwate Prefecture, Japan. 
A sign on the station platform indicates that this was the easternmost railway station on Honshu island.

Lines
Iwate-Funakoshi Station is served by the Rias Line, and was located 60.5 rail kilometers from the terminus of the line at Sakari Station. Formerly, it is served by the Yamada Line.

Station layout
Iwate-Funakoshi Station have two opposed side platforms. The station is unattended.

Platforms

Adjacent stations

History
Iwate-Funakoshi Station opened on 10 November 1936. The station was absorbed into the JR East network upon the privatization of the Japan National Railways (JNR) on 1 April 1987.  Operations on the Yamada Line between Miyako Station and Kamaishi Station were suspended after the 11 March 2011 Tōhoku earthquake and tsunami. As of 2018, the station have been rebuilt along with the rest of the closed segment of the Yamada Line. It was transferred to the Sanriku Railway upon completion on 23 March 2019. This segment joined up with the Kita-Rias Line on one side and the Minami-Rias Line on the other, which together constitutes the entire Rias Line. Accordingly, this station became an intermediate station of Rias Line.

Surrounding area
  National Route 45
 Funakoshi Post Office

References

External links

 JR East Station information 

Railway stations in Iwate Prefecture
Rias Line
Railway stations in Japan opened in 1936
Yamada, Iwate